Shin Ji-a (Hangul: 신지아; born 19 March 2008) is a South Korean figure skater. She is the 2023 South Korean national champion. At the junior level, she is a two-time World Junior silver medalist (2022 and 2023), the 2022–23 Junior Grand Prix Final silver medalist, a three-time ISU Junior Grand Prix medalist, and the 2021 South Korean junior champion.

Career

Early years 
Shin began learning to skate in 2015, having been inspired by Kim Yu-na. She won the national junior gold medal at the 2021 South Korean Championships.

2021–22 season: Junior World silver 
Making her international debut on the Junior Grand Prix at the 2021 JGP Slovenia in Ljubljana, Shin finished in sixth place. The following week, she competed in her second event on the circuit, the 2021 JGP Poland in Gdańsk. She ranked second in the short program and third in the long due to a fall on the opening triple lutz. Shin won the bronze medal with only a 0.03 point gap from silver medalist Elizaveta Kulikova. In her first senior event, Shin was fourth at the 2022 South Korean Championships. 

Shin was assigned to compete at the 2022 World Junior Championships, but events would soon complicate the situation. Shortly after the conclusion of the 2022 Winter Olympics, Russia invaded Ukraine. As a result, the International Skating Union banned all Russian athletes from competing at ISU championships. As Russian women had dominated international figure skating in recent years, this had a significant impact on the field. Due to both the invasion and the Omicron variant, the World Junior Championships could not be held as scheduled in Sofia in early March and were rescheduled for mid-April in Tallinn. Shin finished second in the short program, 3.12 points behind segment leader Isabeau Levito of the United States. She went on to win the free skate, taking a gold small medal for that segment but remained in second overall behind Levito by 0.54 points. She was only the second South Korean to win a World Junior medal, the first one being Yuna Kim.

2022–23 season: JGP Final and Junior World silver, first national title
Shin began the season on the Junior Grand Prix, winning the gold medal at the 2022 JGP Latvia in Riga. This included a new personal best in the short program, clearing 70 points in that segment for the first time. At her second event, the second of two Polish Junior Grand Prixes held in Gdańsk, she won the silver medal behind Japanese skater Ami Nakai. With a total of 28 points, Shin qualified to the 2022–23 Junior Grand Prix Final. 

After winning the national ranking competition in Uijeongbu in early December, Shin traveled to Turin the following week for the Junior Grand Prix Final. She skated a clean short program, placing second just 0.55 points behind the leader, Japan's Mao Shimada. Referring to performing again so soon after the ranking competition, Shin said she was "really tired, but it's OK." She was second in the free skate and also second overall, saying she was "satisfied with the result, the clean program, and the silver medal." She and bronze medalist Kim Chae-yeon were the first Korean women to medal since Kim Yu-na in 2005. She reflected on Kim as her inspiration, noting "I want to follow her path.". 

Shin placed second in the short program at the 2023 South Korean Championships, behind Kim Ye-lim, after stepping out of her jump combination. She won the free skate despite colliding with the boards attempting the same jump combination, and overtook Kim to take the gold medal. 

Due to her ineligibility for senior competition, Shin was assigned to finish her season at the 2023 World Junior Championships in Calgary. Entering as the defending silver medalist, she finished second in the short program with a new personal best 71.19, 0.59 points behind segment leader Shimada. She cleanly landed most of her jumps in the free skate, only to fall at the end of her choreographic sequence and take a one-point deduction. She finished narrowly second in the segment, just ahead of Nakai, and won her second consecutive Junior World silver medal. Calling this "a great highlight" after having felt sick earlier in the week, she also announced plans to work with veteran choreographer David Wilson on programs for the following season.

Programs

Competitive highlights 
GP: Grand Prix; CS: Challenger Series; JGP: Junior Grand Prix

Detailed results

Junior results

References

External links 
 

2008 births
South Korean female single skaters
Living people
Sportspeople from Busan
World Junior Figure Skating Championships medalists